The qualification rounds of the 1958 European Aquatics Championship women's 100 metre freestyle were held on 31 August 1958. 19 nations competed, and the final was on 1 September.

Records 

A new record was set at the competition:

Results

Qualifications

Final

Sources 

 

1958 European Aquatics Championships